The 1985 Australian Swimming Championships were held at the Melbourne State Swimming Centre from Thursday 21 February to Sunday 24 February. They were organised by Amateur Swimming Union of Australia.

Medal winners

Men's events

Legend:

Women's events

Legend:

References

Australian Swimming Championships
Australian Swimming Championships, 1985
Sports competitions in Melbourne
Swim
1980s in Melbourne